Podocarpus aracensis is a species of conifer in the family Podocarpaceae.
It is found only in Brazil.

References

aracensis
Least concern plants
Taxonomy articles created by Polbot
Taxa named by David John de Laubenfels